In poker, a starting hand is the initial set of cards dealt to a player before any voluntary betting takes place. For example, in seven-card stud this is two downcards and one upcard, in Texas hold 'em it is two downcards, and in five-card draw it is five cards.

The one decision made by every poker player on every deal of every game is whether to continue playing that hand after seeing that first set of cards. Since making this decision correctly will lead to the most long-run profit for a skilled player, players often put considerable study into what the appropriate starting hand "standards" are for the game being played.

Optimal starting hand standards can be very sensitive to factors such as the betting structure of a game, position, and the character of the other players, as well as the rules of the game being played.

See also
 Domination
 List of poker hand nicknames
 Poker strategy
 Texas hold 'em starting hands

Poker hands